Asian Survey: A Bimonthly Review of Contemporary Asian Affairs is a bimonthly academic journal of Asian studies published by the University of California Press on behalf of the Institute of East Asian Studies at the University of California, Berkeley. The journal was established in 1932 as Memorandum (Institute of Pacific Relations, American Council), but was renamed Far Eastern Survey in 1935. The journal acquired its current name in 1961. The journal uses double-blind peer review.

According to the Journal Citation Reports, the journal has a 2021 impact factor of 0.511. The editor-in-chief is Uk Heo (University of Wisconsin-Milwaukee).

Abstracting and indexing 
The journal is abstracted and indexed in:
 GEOBASE
 Scopus
 MLA - Modern Language Association Database
 Worldwide Political Science Abstracts
 Historical Abstracts

References

External links
 
 Homepage for the Institute of East Asian Studies at the University of California, Berkeley

Asian studies journals
University of California Press academic journals
Publications established in 1932
Bimonthly journals
English-language journals